Cassard was an anti-aircraft destroyer of the French Marine Nationale, lead ship of the . She was the 10th vessel of the French Navy named after the 18th century captain Jacques Cassard.

Service history
Cassard was fitted with a number of prototype equipments which were later incorporated into the  frigates.

In April 2016, Cassard was named as one of the ships participating in Operation Griffin Strike, a test of the Combined Joint Expeditionary Force between the French and British armed forces.

References

Cold War frigates of France
Frigates of France
Cassard-class frigates
Ships built in France
1988 ships